The Bayeux War Cemetery is the largest Second World War cemetery of Commonwealth soldiers in France, located in Bayeux, Normandy. The cemetery contains 4,648 burials, mostly of the Invasion of Normandy. Opposite this cemetery stands the Bayeux Memorial which commemorates more than 1,800 casualties of the Commonwealth forces who died in Normandy and have no known grave.

The cemetery grounds were assigned to the United Kingdom in perpetuity by France in recognition of the sacrifices made by the British Empire in the defence and liberation of France during the war. In addition to the Commonwealth burials, there are 466 graves of German soldiers.

The cemetery contains the Cross of Sacrifice or War Cross, designed by Sir Reginald Blomfield for the Commonwealth War Graves Commission (CWGC).

Queen Elizabeth II and President of France Jacques Chirac attended ceremonies at the cemetery on 6 June 2004, marking the 60th anniversary of the D-Day invasion.
Queen Elizabeth II and President of France François Hollande attended ceremonies at the cemetery on 6 June 2014, marking the 70th anniversary of the D-Day invasion.

History
The CWGC is responsible for marking and maintaining the graves of those members of the Commonwealth forces who died during the two world wars. Of the 18 Commonwealth cemeteries in Normandy containing 22,000 casualties of the invasion, Bayeux is largest.

Although there was not a particular battle fought in Bayeux itself, casualties were brought to this cemetery from around the region. This includes field hospitals and soldiers who died on Sword Beach.

Notable graves

British Army Corporal Sidney Bates, a member of the 1st Battalion The Royal Norfolk Regiment, was awarded the Victoria Cross for his gallant actions on 6 August 1944 near Sourdeval.

Five members of one aircrew are buried together: Royal Air Force Flying Officer B.E. Bell (pilot); Flying Officer H.D. Clark (air gunner); Sergeant J. Holden (wireless operator/air gunner); Sergeant J.J. Reed (air gunner); and Royal Australian Air Force Flying Officer D. MacFadyen. They all died 10 June 1944.

The Bayeux Memorial
The Bayeux Memorial was erected in white stone facing the cemetery. The Latin epitaph along the frieze of the memorial is reference to William the Conqueror and the Invasion of England in 1066: NOS A GULIELMO VICTI VICTORIS PATRIAM LIBERAVIMUS. The translation reads: "We, once conquered by William, have now set free the Conqueror's native land."

On this memorial are engraved the names of the 1,808 men of the Commonwealth who died in the Battle of Normandy and who have no known grave.
The Bayeux Memorial in Normandy, France commemorates 270 Canadian servicemen and women.

Among the names are the 189 men of the 43rd Divisional Reconnaissance Regiment who were aboard the ill-fated MV Derrycunihy. On the night of 23 July 1944, the ship was anchored off the coast of Ouistreham (Sword Beach), and the regiment was awaiting to disembark. At 0800 the ship's engines detonated a submerged German mine, ripping the hull apart. This was the biggest British loss of life off the Normandy beaches. The 189 missing men's names are engraved on the wall in Bayeux.

Location
The cemetery is located in Bayeux, in the Calvados commune, on the Boulevard Fabian Ware (D.5). It is located 24 kilometres north-west of Caen and 13 kilometres south of Arromanches-les-Bains.

In culture
The cemetery is the subject of a poem by Charles Causley, "At the British War Cemetery, Bayeux".  He later stated that he had been inspired to write by his visit to the cemetery because it was the first war cemetery he had ever visited.

See also
 American Battle Monuments Commission
 UK National Inventory of War Memorials
 German War Graves Commission
 List of military cemeteries in Normandy

References

Further reading
 Shilleto, Carl, and Tolhurst, Mike (2008). "A Traveler's Guide to D-Day and the Battle of Normandy". Northampton, Mass.: Interlink.

External links

 
 
 
 At the British War Cemetery, Bayeux (poem); by Charles Causley
 Maple Leaf Legacy Project
 Australian War Grave Photographic Archive
 South Africa War Graves Project
 United Kingdom National Inventory of War Memorials 
 South Africans buried in Bayeux War Cemetery
 A guide to Bayeux War Cemetery

Bayeux
British military memorials and cemeteries
Canadian military memorials and cemeteries
Commonwealth War Graves Commission cemeteries in France
1944 establishments in France
Operation Overlord cemeteries
World War II memorials in France